Crown Theatre with Gloria Swanson is a 30-minute weekly syndicated American anthology series produced by Bing Crosby Productions with production in Culver City. It was filmed in New York City (except for some episodes that were filmed in Mexico) and aired from 1952–55 on WPIX.

Gloria Swanson served as the hostess for the series and appeared in four episodes. Its guest stars included Vera Miles, Bonita Granville, Barbara Billingsley, Bobby Driscoll, Marjorie Lord, Hans Conreid, Denver Pyle, and Gigi Perreau.

References

External links
Crown Theatre with Gloria Swanson at CVTA with episode list

1952 American television series debuts
1955 American television series endings
English-language television shows
1950s American anthology television series
First-run syndicated television programs in the United States